The Beginning EP is the second EP released by the Tennessee-based band The Features.  It was originally released independently in 2001.  It was later re-released upon their signing with a major label (first by Fierce Panda Records in the UK on September 22, 2003 and then by Universal Records in the United States on March 16, 2004) with new cover art and the addition of the song "That's The Way It's Meant To Be" which was included as a preview of their debut album Exhibit A.

Original Track listing
Stark White Stork Approaching – 1:29
Walk You Home – 3:01
Bumble Bee – 3:39
The Beginning (Week One) – 2:41
Two By Two – 4:23

Standard Track listing
The Beginning (Week One) – 2:42
Walk You Home – 3:00
Bumble Bee – 3:38
Two By Two – 4:20
Stark White Stork Approaching – 1:28
The Way It's Meant to Be – 2:08

Personnel
Matt Pelham - Vocals, Guitar
Rollum Haas - Drums
Roger Dabbs - Bass
Parrish Yaw - Keyboards
Written and Performed by The Features
Tracks 1, 2, & 4 produced by Brian Carter
Track 3 & 5 produced by Brian Owen Bottcher
Track 6 produced by Craig Krampf
Track 6 co-produced by Mike McCarthy & The Features
Recorded & Mixed by Mike McCarthy
Tracks 1-5 mastered by Glenn Meadows at Masterfonics
Track 6 mastered by Howie Weinberg at Masterdisk
Recording Assisted by Joshua Hood & John Stinson
Original Version Photography & Design by Brian Owe Bottcher
Universal Records Version Design by Jim Valosik

External links
http://www.thefeatures.com
http://www.universalrecords.com

2004 EPs
The Features EPs
Pop albums by American artists